This is a list of museums in Greece by regional unit.

Attica

Central Athens
Archaeological
Acropolis Museum
Archaeological Museum of Kerameikos
Epigraphical Museum
Goulandris Museum of Cycladic Art
Museum of the Ancient Agora
Museum of the Center for the Acropolis Studies
National Archaeological Museum of Athens
Old Acropolis Museum
Numismatic Museum of Athens
Syntagma Metro Station Archaeological Collection
Byzantine, Ecclesiastic
Byzantine and Christian Museum (of Athens)
Biographical, City, Diachronic, Ethnic, Ethnographic, History, Historic House
Benaki Museum
Eleftherios Venizelos Historical Museum
Jewish Museum of Greece
Museum of Pavlos and Alexandra Kanellopoulou
Museum of the City of Athens
National Historical Museum of Greece (Old Parliament House)

Folklore, Folk art
Centre for the Study of Traditional Pottery
Ilias Lalaounis Jewelry Museum
Museum of Greek Folk Art
Museum of Greek Folk Musical Instruments
Museum of the History of the Greek Costume

Art museums and galleries, Music, Theater, Culture, Popular Art
Athinais Culture Center
Bernier–Eliades Gallery Museum
Basil & Elise Goulandris Foundation, Museum of Modern & Contemporary Art
City of Athens Cultural Center
Design Museum of the 20th Century
Frissiras Museum
Gounaropoulos Museum
Herakleidon Art Museum
Museum of Engravings and Graphic Arts
Marika Kotopouli Museum
Melina Merkouri Cultural Center
Municipal Gallery of Athens
Museum of Children's Art in Plaka
National Art Gallery  
National Glyptotheque
National Museum of Contemporary Art, Athens
Paxinou-Minotis Museum
Pieridis Museum of Ancient Cypriot Greek Art & Contemporary Art
The N. Chatzikiriakos-Gkikas Art Gallery
Technopolis (Gazi)
Theatrical Museum of Greece

Industry, Maritime, Military, Mill, Railway, Science, Technology
Athens War Museum
Evgenidio Foundation
Hellenic Air Force Museum
Hellenic Motor Museum
Railway Museum of Athens

Anthropology, Natural History, Geology, Paleontology
Museum of Anthropology, University of Athens
Museum of Geology and Paleontology of the Athens University
Zoological Museum of the University of Athens

Children, Education, Special Interests, Sports, University
Athens University Museum
Hellenic Children's Museum
Postal & Philatelic Museum of Greece
Museum of Greek Children's Art (M.G.C.A.)

North Athens
Deste Foundation (exhibition area)
 Drossinis Museum
Spathario Museum
Yiannis Tsarouchis Foundation Museum
OTE Museum of Telecommunications, Kifisia
Gaia Center
Goulandris Natural History Museum

South Athens
Evgenidio Foundation (Planetarium and Science museum)
Greek armored cruiser Georgios Averof
Tactual Museum of Athens

Piraeus regional unit
Archaeological
Archaeological Museum of Piraeus
Art museums and galleries, Theater
Municipal Art Gallery of Piraeus
Panos Aravantinos Decor Museum
Maritime, Railway
Electric Railways Museum of Piraeus
Hellenic Maritime Museum (Piraeus)

Islands regional unit
Archaeological Museum of Aegina 
Archaeological Museum of Poros 
Archaeological Museum of Kythera 
Pavlos Kountouriotis Mansion, Hydra 
Spetses Museum

West Attica
Archaeological
Archaeological Museum of Eleusis
Archaeological Museum of Megara 
Art museums and galleries
Skironio Museum Polychronopoulos

East Attica
Archaeological
Archaeological Museum of Acharnes (part of Folk Art Museum of Acharnes)
Archaeological Museum of Brauron
Archaeological Museum of Lavrion
Archaeological Museum of Marathon
Athens International Airport Archaeological Collection
Schimatari Museum 
Folklore, Folk art
Folk Art Museum of Acharnes
Zygomalas Museum, Avlonas
Vorres Museum, Paiania
Technology, Geology
 Phaethon Technological Museum (car museum) (Kalamos)
Mineralogical Museum of Lavrion

Central Macedonia

Thessaloniki regional unit
Archaeological
Archaeological Museum of Thessaloniki
Museum of Roman Forum
Museum of Plaster Casts (Thessaloniki)
Museum of the Royal Tombs of Aigai (Vergina)
Byzantine, Ecclesiastic
Crypt of Agios Demetrios 
Museum of Byzantine Culture
White Tower of Thessaloniki
Biographical, City, Diachronic, Ethnic, Ethnographic, History, Historic House, Natural History
Holocaust Museum of Greece (under construction)
Atatürk Museum (Thessaloniki)
Historical Museum of the Balkan Wars
Jewish Museum of Thessaloniki
Museum of the Macedonian Struggle
Natural History Museum (Thessaloniki)
Folklore, Folk art
Folk Art and Ethnological Museum of Macedonia and Thrace
Nature and Folklore Museum of Loutra Almopias
Art museums and galleries, Music, Theater, Culture, Popular Art
Art Gallery of the Society of Macedonian Studies
Cinema Museum of Thessaloniki
Design Museum of Thessaloniki
Macedonian Museum of Contemporary Art
Museum of the Macedonian Art Society
National Bank Museum of the Cultural Center of Northern Greece
Museum of Photography Thessaloniki
Industry, Maritime, Military, Mill, Railway, Science, Technology
National Map Library
Railway Museum of Thessaloniki
Science Center and Technology Museum "Noesis"
War Museum of Thessaloniki
Water Supply Museum
Children, Education, Special Interests, Sports, University
Museum of the Aristotle University of Thessaloniki
Plaster Casts Museum of the Aristotle University of Thessaloniki
Thessaloniki Olympic Museum (former Sports Museum) 
The water museum of Thessaloniki

Imathia
Agricultural
Wine and Vine Museum (Naoussa)
Archaeological
Archaeological Museum of Veroia
Vergina (Building for the protection of the royal tombs > see section)
Byzantine, Ecclesiastic
Byzantine Museum of Veroia
Folklore
Folklore Museum of the Lyceum of Hellenic Women (Naoussa)
Folklore Museum of Veroia

Kilkis regional unit
Archaeological
Archaeological Museum of Kilkis
History, War
 Military museum of Kilkis 
Museum of the Battle of Lahanas
Folklore
Macedonian Folklore Museum (Goumenissa)

Serres regional unit
Archaeological
Archaeological Museum of Amphipolis
Archaeological Museum (Serres)
Byzantine, Ecclesiastic
Ecclesiastical Museum of the Holy Bishopry of Serres and Nigrita
Museum of the Old Cathedral at Serres 
Folklore
Mihalis Tsartsidis Folklore and History Museum (Sidirokastro)
Sarakatsani Folklore Museum

Chalkidiki
Archaeological
Archaeological Museum of Polygyros
Byzantine, Ecclesiastic
Tower of Ouranoupolis 
Folklore
Folklore Museum (Polygyros)
History and Folklore Museum (Arnaia)

Pella regional unit
Archaeological
Archaeological Museum of Pella
Ecclesiastical
Ecclesiastical Museum (Edessa)
Folklore
Folklore Museum (Edessa)
Folklore Museum (Yannitsa)

Pieria
Archaeological
Archaeological Museum of Dion
Geological
Olympus Geological Museum (Leptokaria)
Folklore
Folklore Museum (Katerini)

East Macedonia and Thrace

Rhodope regional unit
Archaeological
Archaeological Museum of Komotini
Byzantine, Ecclesiastic
Byzantine Museum of Komotini
Ecclesiastical Museum of the Holy Bishopry of Maroneia and Komotini 
Folklore, Folk art
Basketry Museum of the Roma
Folklore Museum of Komotini

Kavala
Archaeological
Archaeological Museum of Kavala
Archaeological Museum of Philippi 
Folklore, Folk art
Cultural House of Nea Karvali 
Industry, Maritime, Military, Mill, Railway, Science, Technology
Tobacco Museum 
Maritime Museum of Kavala 
Olive and Oil Museum (Eleochori)

Thasos
Archaeological Museum of Thasos

Evros regional unit
Archaeological
Archaeological Museum of Samothrace 
Byzantine, Ecclesiastic
Alexandroupolis Ecclesiastical Museum 
Ethnographic, History
 Ethnological Museum of Thrace (Angeliki Giannakidou) 
Industrial, Technology
 Art of Silk Museum, Soufli

Xanthi regional unit
Archaeological
Archaeological Museum of Abdera

Drama regional unit
Archaeological
Archaeological Museum of Drama
History
Natural History Museum (Paranesti)
Folklore
Folklore Museum (Drama)

West Macedonia

Kozani regional unit
Archaeological
Aiani Archaeological Museum
Archaeological Museum of Kozani
Byzantine, Ecclesiastic
Ecclesiastical Museum of Siatista
Ethnographic, History, Folklore, Folk art
Anthropological and Folklore Museum (Ptolemaida)
Historical - Folklore and Natural History Museum of Kozani
Museum of Modern Local History of Kozani
Natural History, Geology, Paleontology
Paleontological and Historical Museum of Ptolemais
Paleontological Museum of Siatista

Kastoria regional unit
Archaeological
Dispilio Lakeside Neolithic Settlement Archaeological Collection
Architectural
Monuments Museum (Kastoria)
Byzantine, Ecclesiastic
Byzantine Museum of Kastoria
Folklore, Folk art
Costume Museum (Kastoria)
Folklore Museum of Kastoria

Florina regional unit
Archaeological
Archaeological Museum of Florina
Art museums and galleries
Florina Museum of Modern Art
The Florina Art Gallery
Folklore
Folklore Museum of the Aristotle Association
Folklore Museum of the Culture Club
Museum of Folklore and History (Drosopigi)

Grevena regional unit
History
Grevena Municipal Museum

Epirus

Ioannina regional unit
Archaeological
Archaeological Museum of Ioannina
Byzantine, Ecclesiastic
Byzantine Museum of Ioannina
Ethnographic, History, War
1912–1913 War Museum
Athanasios Vrellis Museum of Wax Effigies (in town) 
Municipal Ethnographic Museum of Ioannina
Ethnographic Museum of the Ioannina University
Ethnographic Museum of Pyrsoghianni
Historical Museum of Ioannina
Museum of National Resistance
Pavlos Vrellis Museum of Hellenic History
War Museum of Kalpaki
Folklore, Folk art
Folk Art Museum of Epirus - "Kostas Frontzos"
Museum of the Foundation for the Epirotic Studies
Tositsa Baron Museum of Metsovo
Art museums and galleries
Averoff Gallery (Metsovo)
Municipal Art Gallery of Ioannina

Arta regional unit
Archaeological
Archaeological Collection of Arta
Folklore, Folk art
Arta Folklore Museum of "Skoufas" Association

Preveza regional unit
Archaeological
 Archaeological Museum of Nikopolis in Preveza City

Thesprotia
Archaeological
Archaeological Museum of Igoumenitsa

Thessaly

Magnesia
Archaeological
Archaeological Museum of Almyros
Archaeological Museum of Volos
Byzantine, Ecclesiastic
Ecclesiastic Museum of Aghia Marina
Biographical, Ethnographic, History
Hellenic Museum of Zagora
Folklore, Folk art
Museum of Folk Art and History of Pelion
Kitsos Makris Folklore Museum
Theofilos Museum of Anakasia
Art museums and galleries
Alexander K.Damtsas Museum
Municipal Art Gallery of Volos
Industry, Railway, Technology
Thessaly Railway Museum
Tsalapatas National Museum of Industrial History 
Natural history
Athanasios Koutroumbas Insect Museum, in Volos

Sporades
Alonissos Museum 
Papadiamantis House Museum of Skiathos 
Folklore Museum of Skopelos
Photographic Center of Skopelos

Larissa regional unit
Diachronic
Diachronic Museum of Larissa 
Ethnographic, Historical, Folklore, Folk art, Ecclesiastical
 Folklore and Historical Museum of Larissa 
 Folklore and Historical Museum of Ambelakia 
 G. Schwartz Mansion of Ambelakia 
 Folklore Museum of Gonnoi 
 Folklore Museum of Livadi – G. Olympios Mansion 
 Folklore Museum of Dolichi 
 Museum of Thessalic Life of Elateia 
 Hatzigogos Inn Historical Museum of Sarantaporo 
 Wine Museum of Rapsani 
 Wine Museum of Tyrnavos 
 Folklore Museum of Verdikoussia 
Art museums and Galleries
 Municipal Art Gallery – G.I Katsigra Museum of Larissa 
Anthropology, Natural History, Geology, Paleontology
Military, Science, Biographical, Education
 Larissa Museum of National Resistance of Thessaly 
 School Museum of Farsala

Central Greece

Phthiotis
Archaeological
Archaeological Museum of Atalanti 
Archaeological Collection of Elateia 
Archaeological Museum of Lamia
Byzantine, Ecclesiastic
 Byzantine Museum of Phthiotida

Phocis
Archaeological
Amfissa Archaeological Museum 
Archaeological Collection of Lidoriki 
Delphi Archaeological Museum
Galaxidi Archaeological Collection

Euboea regional unit
Archaeological
Archaeological Museum of Eretria
Archaeological Museum of Skyros 
Archaeological Museum of Chalkis 
Archaeological Museum of Karystos 
Folklore, Folk art
Folklore Museum of Kymi 
Manos Faltaits Museum (Skyros)

Boeotia
Archaeological
Archaeological Museum of Chaironeia 
Archaeological Museum of Thebes 
Distomo Archaeological Collection
Schimatari Museum

Ionian Islands

Corfu regional unit
Archaeological
Archaeological Museum of Corfu
 Archaeological Museum of Paleopolis
Byzantine, Ecclesiastic
Byzantine Museum of Antivouniotissa
Biographical, Ethnic, History
Kapodistrias Museum
Serbian Museum of Corfu
Solomos Museum 
Art museums and galleries
Museum of Asian art of Corfu
 Municipal Gallery of Corfu 
 Music Museum
The Music Museum 'Nikolaos Halikiopoulos Mantzaros' of the Philharmonic Society of Corfu
 Numismatic Museum
 Banknote Museum

Zakynthos
Byzantine, Ecclesiastic
Byzantine Museum of Zakynthos 
Biographical, History
Museum of Dionysios Solomos and Eminent Zakynthians 
Museum of Grigorios Xenopoulos

Cephalonia
Archaeological
Archaeological Museum of Argostoli 
Archaeological Collection of Stavros 

Folklore, Folk art
Korgialeneio Historical and Folklore Museum 

Natural history
Museum of Natural History of Cephalonia and Ithaca 

Byzantine, Ecclesiastic
St. Andrew Convent- The ecclesiastical Museum 

Maritime
Maritime Museum of the Ionian Sea 
Nautical and Environmental Museum of Fiscardo

Ithaca
Archaeological Museum of Vathy

Lefkada regional unit
Archaeological
Archaeological Museum of Lefkada

West Greece

Achaea
Archaeological
Archaeological Museum of Aigion
Archaeological Museum of Patras
Fissini Street Archeological Collection (Patras)
Ethnographic, History
Historical Museum of The Aghia Lavra Monastery
Museum of the Sacrifice of the People of Kalavryta
Folklore, Folk art
Folk Art Museum of Patras
Art museums and galleries, Popular art
Popular Art Museum of Chalandritsa
Natural history
Zoological Museum of the Patras University
Science and Technology
Museum of Science & Technology of the University of Patras

Aetolia-Acarnania
Archaeological
Archaeological Museum of Agrinion
Archaeological Museum of Thyrreion 
Ethnographic, Folklore, History
Aitoloakarnania Folklore Museum
Museum of the History of the Holy City of Mesolongi
Ethnographic Museum of Kaletzi
Ethnographic Museum of Lefkasio

Elis
Archaeological
Archaeological Museum of Elis 
Archaeological Museum of Olympia
The Old Museum of Olympia 
Sports
Museum of the Modern Olympic Games 
Technology
Museum of Ancient Greek Technology (Ilia)

Peloponnese

Argolis
Archaeological
Archaeological Museum of Argos
Archaeological Museum of Epidaurus
Archaeological Museum of Mycenae 
Archaeological Museum of Nafplion
Archaeological Museum of Nemea
Byzantine, Ecclesiastic
Byzantine Museum of Argolis 
Folklore, Folk art
Komboloi Museum 
Laskarideio Folklore Museum

Messenia
Archaeological
 Archaeological Museum of Chora
Archaeological Museum of Messenia
Benakeion Archaeological Museum of Kalamata  Now defunct, see Archaeological Museum of Messenia
Museum of Ancient Messene

Arcadia
Archaeological
Archaeological Museum of Astros
Archaeological Museum of Lykosoura 
 Archaeological Museum of Tegea
Open-air
Dimitsana Open-air Water Power Museum

Corinthia
Archaeological
Archaeological Museum of Ancient Corinth
Archaeological Museum of Isthmia 
Ethnographic, Folklore, Historical
Historical and Folklore Museum of Corinth

Laconia
Archaeological
Archaeological Museum of Sparta
Monemvasia Archaeological Collection 
Byzantine, Ecclesiastic
Archaeological Museum of Mystras

North Aegean

Chios regional unit
Archaeological
Archaeological Museum of Chios
Byzantine, Ecclesiastic
Chios Byzantine Museum
Museum of Nea Moni at Chios 
Maritime
 Chios Maritime Museum

Lesbos
Archaeological
Archaeological – Folklore Collection of Napi 
Archaeological Museum of Mytilene
Geology, Natural History, Paleontology
Natural History Museum of the Lesvos Petrified Forest
Ouzo
Ouzo Museum – The World of Ouzo

Lemnos regional unit
Archaeological Museum of Lemnos

Ikaria regional unit
Archaeological Collection of Agios Kirykos

Samos
Archaeological
Archaeological Museum of Samos 
Kambos Archaeological Museum 
 The Paleontological Museum of Mytilinioi (Samos)

South Aegean

Andros
Archaeological Museum of Andros
Archaeological Museum of Palaiopolis
Andros Museum of Modern Art
Andros Maritime Museum

Kalymnos regional unit
Archaeological Museum of Astypalaia
Archaeological Museum of Kalymnos 
Vouvalis Mansion (Kalymnos)

Karpathos regional unit
Archaeological Museum of Karpathos (future)

Kea-Kythnos
Archaeological Museum of Kea

Kos regional unit
Archaeological Museum of Kos 
Archaeological Museum of Nisyros

Milos regional unit
Archaeological
 Archaeological Museum of Kimolos 
Archaeological Museum of Milos 
 Archaeological Collection of Serifos 
 Archaeological Museum of Sifnos
 Archaeological Collection of Agios Andreas on Sifnos
Byzantine, Ecclesiastic
 Ecclesiastical Museum in Adamas (Milos)
Other
 Milos Mining Museum (Adamas on Milos)

Mykonos
Archaeological Museum of Delos
Archaeological Museum of Mykonos
Mykonos Folklore Museum
Aegean Maritime Museum (Mykonos)

Naxos regional unit
Archaeological
Archaeological Collection of Amorgos
Archaeological Museum of Apeiranthos
Archaeological Museum of Gyroulas at Sangri
Archaeological Museum of Naxos
Byzantine, Ecclesiastic
Byzantine Museum of Naxos
Other
Apiranthos Natural History Museum
Vallindras Distilery (Kitron Naxou distillery in Chalkio on Naxos) ! Not listed as a museum 
Venetian Museum (Della Rocca Barozzi at Naxos)

Paros regional unit
Archaeological Museum of Paros

Rhodes regional unit
 Archaeological Museum of Rhodes
 Kastellorizo Archaeological Museum
 Palace of the Grand Masters (Rhodes)
 Kastellorizo Folk Art Museum
 Decorative Arts Collection, Rhodes
 Aquarium of Rhodes
 Bee Museum of Rhodes
 Museum of Mineralogy & Paleontology Stamatiadis, Rhodes

Syros
Archaeological Museum of Syros

Thira regional unit
 Archaeological Collection of Anafi
 Folegandros Folklore Museum
Archaeological Museum of Ios 
Archaeological Museum of Thera
Museum of Prehistoric Thira

Tinos
Archaeological Museum of Tinos

Crete

Chania regional unit
Archaeological
Archaeological Museum of Chania
Archaeological Museum of Kissamos 
Byzantine, Ecclesiastic
Byzantine and Post-Byzantine Collection of Chania
Museum of the Monastery of Agia Triada Tsangarolon
Museum of the Monastery of Chryssopighi
Museum of the Monastery of Gonia
Biographical, Ethnographic, History
Eleftherios Venizelos Museum of Chalepa
Historical, Folklore
Historical and Folklore Museum of Gavalochori 
Maritime, War
Maritime Museum of Crete
War Museum of Chania
Children, Education
School Life Museum

Heraklion regional unit
Archaeological
Heraklion Archaeological Museum
Byzantine, Ecclesiastic
Collection of Agia Aikaterini of Sinai
Collection of Agios Matthaios of Sinai
Biographical, Ethnographic, History, War
Historical Museum of Crete
Museum of Cretan Ethnology
Museum of the Battle of Crete
Nikos Kazantzakis Museum
Folklore, Open Air
Art museums and galleries
Museum of Visual Arts
Natural History
Aquaworld Aquarium
Natural History Museum of Crete

Rethymno regional unit
Archaeological
Archaeological Museum of Rethymno
Museum of Ancient Eleutherna
Byzantine, Ecclesiastic
Museum of the Monastery of Arkadi
Museum of the Monastery of Preveli
Ethnographic, Folklore, Historical
 Historical and Folklore Museum of Rethymno
Folklore, Folk art
The Frantzeskaki Collection
Art museums and galleries
Municipal Gallery "L.Kanakakis"
Natural history
Museum of Sea Life at Rethymno
Paleolithic museum of Rethymno

Lasithi (regional unit)
Archaeological
Archaeological Collection of Neapolis 
Archaeological Museum of Agios Nikolaos
Archaeological Museum of Sitia

References

External links

 Museums in Greece by the Greek National Tourism Organisation
 Ministry of culture of Greece /Museums
 City of Athens /Museums
 City of Athens/Visitors' website /Museums
 Athens Museums' Guide with Reviews
 Greek museums info

Greece
Museums
Museums
Museums
Greece